The Manfred Stakes is a Melbourne Racing Club Group 3 Thoroughbred horse race for three-year-olds at set weights with penalties run over a distance of 1200 metres at Caulfield Racecourse, Melbourne, Australia in late January or early February. Prize money is A$200,000.

History
The race is named in honour of the champion racehorse Manfred, who won the 1925 AJC Derby, Victoria Derby and W. S. Cox Plate.  In 1926 he was also successful in the Caulfield Cup.

The race was usually held at Caulfield Racecourse but was moved to Sandown Racecourse for 2015 and scheduled to be raced on Australia Day. The race was upgraded in 2014 to Group 3, a class that the race held between 1983–1990.

Name
1968–1978 - Manfred Stakes
 1979–1982 - Schweppes Cup
 1983 - Schweppes Centenary Cup
 1984–2004 -  Schweppes Cup
 2005 - Schweppervescence Cup
 2006 - Manfred Stakes
 2007–2010 - Wellington Racing Club Stakes
 2011 onwards - Manfred Stakes

Grade
1968–1978 - Principal race
 1979–1990 - Group 3
 1991–2013 - Listed race
 2014 onwards  - Group 3

Distance
 1968–1972 - 6 furlongs (~1200 metres)
 1973  – 1400 metres
 1974–1975  – 1600 metres
 1976  – 1400 metres
 1977–2004 – 1600 metres
 2005–2010 – 1400 metres
 2011 – 1300 metres 
 2012–2014 – 1200 metres
 2015 – 1300 metres
 2016 onwards - 1200 metres

Venue
 1996, 2011, 2015 - Sandown Racecourse

Winners

2022 - Generation
2021 - Portland Sky
2020 - Super Seth
2019 - Tin Hat
2018 - Cliff's Edge
2017 - Legless Veuve
2016 - Puritan
2015 - Java
2014 - Bull Point
2013 - Mirage              
2012 - Mosheen         
2011 - Enjin Number Nine         
2010 - Denman                    
2009 - Nicconi             
2008 - Turffontein        
2007 - Haradasun         
2006 - Thin And Crispy       
2005 - Niconero       
2004 - Keep The Faith          
2003 - Conspectus         
2002 - Don Eduardo            
2001 - Academy Dancer            
2000 - Freemason              
1999 - Market Price            
1998 - Prince Standaan    
1997 - Catainer     
1996 - Eureka Jewel        
1995 - Danasinga          
1994 - Tristalove             
1993 - Restitution          
1992 - Dark Ksar               
1991 - Beachside     
1990 - Academian
1989 - Painted Ocean
1988 - Century Judge
1987 - Groucho
1986 - Khamacruz
1985 - Noble Peer
1984 - Pride Of Kellina
1983 - To The Wind
1982 - Getting Closer    
1981 - Real Force        
1980 - Polo Player       
1979 - Fralo             
1978 - Taskwin           
1977 - Super Scope       
1976 - †Zintoba / Silver Shaft      
1975 - Kenmark           
1974 - Bush Win          
1973 - †Flying Gem / Gala Supreme      
1972 - †Andros / Downland          
1971 - Pilgarlic         
1970 - Long Brandy       
1969 - Gay Bachelor      
1968 - Anvil       

† Race run in divisions

See also
 List of Australian Group races
 Group races

References

Flat horse races for three-year-olds
Horse races in Australia
Recurring sporting events established in 1968
1968 establishments in Australia